Anastasis may refer to:

 Anastasis (Greek: ανάσταση), resurrection, most commonly the resurrection of Jesus
 Anastasis, in Christian art, a pictorial representation of the Harrowing of Hell
 Prote Anastasis, Holy Saturday, between Good Friday and Easter Sunday
 Church of the Anastasis, an alternative name for the Church of the Holy Sepulchre, Jerusalem
 MV Anastasis, a vessel belonging to the health charity Mercy Ships
 Anastasis (album), a 2012 album by the band Dead Can Dance
 Gran Kiltias Anastasis, fictional character in Final Fantasy XII

See also 
 Anasazi, the ancient Native American culture of the Four Corners
 Anastas, a masculine given name and a surname
 Anastasia, a feminine given name
 Anastasi (disambiguation)
 Anastasius (disambiguation)
 Anastatica, a genus of resurrection plant